James Center Arena is a 5,000 seat multi-purpose arena in Tuskegee, Alabama. It was built in 1987. The first game was played at the arena was on December 20, 1987. It is the home of the Tuskegee University Golden Tigers basketball teams.

External links
 

Indoor arenas in Alabama
College basketball venues in the United States
Sports venues in Alabama
1987 establishments in Alabama
Sports venues completed in 1987